A Place Where Runaways Are Not Alone is the sixth studio album by American indie-folk, gypsy-punk group Insomniac Folklore. It was recorded by band leader Tyler Hentschel while in St Louis, Missouri at a friends recording studio and released on May 13, 2011 on BD Recs, an independent label based out of St Louis. The albums drums were tracked out of Viking Camel Studio in Pennsylvania. Other parts were recorded remotely in Portland and Scotland and later mixed in St Louis. in The album artwork shows a girl facing a circus ten with a cross on top. Art and layout was created by Tyler Hentschel.

On Insomniac Folklore's website Hentschel says; "We were not expecting to make this album. Really it came out of nowhere. The plan was to follow up last year's L.P. by starting production on our violent and beautiful concept album Hands, Lips & Eyes but somewhere along the way things went wonderfully wrong." Then talks about what to do with these new songs "One night I was racking my brain about the direction of this project and Adrienne threw a couple of ridiculous seeming ideas my direction. We laughed about the ideas for a bit but then I thought about it... A church that is a circus. Tongue in cheek meets serious. No, This is the direction this album needs to go... I ran with it."

Daniel Otto Jack Petersen of the horror punk Group Blaster the Rocket Man, wrote and performed spoken word on "For Certain Serpent Servants" and "World Without End."

Track listing

Personnel 

 Insomniac Folklore
 Tyler Hentschel – Vocals, Guitar, Organ, lyricist, composer, songwriter
 Amanda Curry – Bass, backing vocals
 Adrienne Michelle – Backing vocals, spoken word
 Lisa Barfield – Violin
 Joshua Hedlund – Accordion
 John David Van Beek – Accordion
 Danielle Maes – Violin, backing vocals
 Ayden Simonatti – Drums
 Dennis Childers – Bass

 Additional personnel
 Daniel Otto Jack Petersen – Spoken word
 Kevin Schlereth – Drums
 Jessica, Kevin and Maddie Schlereth – Group vocals

References 

2011 albums
Insomniac Folklore albums